Respect, also called esteem, is a positive feeling or action shown towards someone or something considered important or held in high esteem or regard. It conveys a sense of admiration for good or valuable qualities. It is also the process of honoring someone by exhibiting care, concern, or consideration for their needs or feelings.

Some people may earn the respect of individuals by assisting others or by playing important social roles. In many cultures, individuals are considered to be worthy of respect until they prove otherwise. Courtesies that show respect may include simple words and phrases like "Thank you" in the West or "Namaste" in the Indian subcontinent, or simple physical signs like a slight bow, a smile, direct eye contact, or a simple handshake; however, those acts may have very different interpretations, depending on the cultural context.

Signs and other ways of showing respect

Language 
Respect is a feeling of deep admiration for someone or something elicited by their abilities, qualities and achievements.

An honorific is a word or expression (often a pronoun) that shows respect when used in addressing or referring to a person.

Typically honorifics are used for second and third persons; use for first person is less common. Some languages have anti-honorific first person forms (like "your most humble servant" or "this unworthy person") whose effect is to enhance the relative honor accorded a second or third person.

For instance, it is disrespectful not to use polite language and honorifics when speaking in Japanese with someone having a higher social status. The Japanese honorific "san" can be used when English is spoken.

In China, it is considered rude to call someone by their first name unless the person is known for a long period of time. In work-related situations, people address each other by their title. At home, people often refer to each other by nicknames or terms of kinship. In Chinese culture, individuals often address their friends as juniors and seniors even if they are just a few months younger or older. When the Chinese ask for someone's age, they often do so to know how to address the person.

Physical gestures 

In Islamic cultures around the world, there are many ways to show respect to people. For example, it is recommended to kiss the hands of parents, grandparents and teachers. Also, it is narrated in the sayings of Muhammad that if a person looks at the faces of parents and teachers with a smile, he or she will definitely be rewarded by Allah with success and happiness.

In India, it is customary that, out of respect, when a person's foot accidentally touches a book or any written material (considered to be a manifestations of Saraswati, the goddess of knowledge) or another person's leg, it will be followed by an apology in the form of a single hand gesture (Pranāma) with the right hand, where the offending person first touches the object with the finger tips and then the forehead and/or chest. This also counts for money, which is considered to be a manifestation of the goddess of wealth Lakshmi. Pranāma, or the touching of feet in Indian culture is a sign of respect. For instance, when a child is greeting his or her grandparent, they typically will touch their hands to their grandparents' feet. In Indian culture, it is believed that the feet are a source of power and love.

In many African/West Indian descent communities and some non-African/West Indian descent communities, respect can be signified by the touching of fists.

Many gestures or physical acts that are common in the West can be considered disrespectful in Japan. For instance, one should not point directly at someone. When greeting someone or thanking them, it may be insulting if the person of lower status does not bow lower than the person with higher status. The duration and level of the bow depends on many factors such as age and status. Some signs of physical respect apply to women only. If a woman does not wear cosmetics or a brassiere, it is possible that she will be considered unprofessional or others may think she does not care about the situation.

China

Chinese culture 

Unlike Japanese culture, it is not necessary in Chinese culture to bow to one another as a greeting or parting gesture. Bowing is generally reserved as a sign of respect for elders and ancestors. When bowing, they place the fist of the right hand in the palm of their left at stomach level. The deeper the bow, the more respect they are showing.

In Chinese culture, there is not much participation in physical contact, especially when doing business because this can be seen as too casual, thus disrespectful. It is considered rude to slap, pat, or put one's arm around the shoulders of another. However, affection in same-sex friendships in East Asia is much more pronounced than in the West. Same-sex friends will often be seen with their arms around one another, holding hands, and other signs of physical affection.

It is uncommon to see very many hand gestures being used in Chinese culture because this is often considered to be excessive. The Chinese sometimes do not smile or exchange greetings with strangers. Smiling or being friendly to someone you do not know can be considered rude and too familiar. It is also common to see Chinese women covering their mouths when they laugh. Traditionally, a woman who laughed too loudly was considered to be uncouth and ill-bred.

Traditionally, there was not much hand-shaking in Chinese culture. However, this gesture is now widely practiced among men, especially when greeting Westerners or other foreigners. Many Westerners may find Chinese handshakes to be too long or too weak, but this is because a weaker handshake is a gesture of humility and respect.

Kowtowing, or kneeling and bowing so deeply that one's forehead is touching the floor, is practiced during worship at temples. Kowtowing is a powerful gesture reserved mainly for honoring the dead or offering deep respect at a temple.

Many codes of behavior revolve around young people showing respect to older people. Filial piety is a major example of a virtue of having respect for their ancestors, family and elders. Like in many cultures, younger Chinese individuals are expected to defer to older people, let them speak first, sit down after them and not contradict them. Sometimes when an older person enters a room, everyone stands. People are often introduced from oldest to youngest. Often, younger people will go out of their way to open doors for their elders and not cross their legs in front of them. The older you are the more respect you are expected to be treated with.

Respect as a cultural value

Indigenous American culture 
In many  indigenous American societies, respect serves as an important concept valued in indigenous American culture. In addition to esteem or deference, respect is viewed as a moral value that teaches indigenous individuals about their culture. This moral value is treated as a process that influences participation in the community and also helps individuals develop and become integrated into their culture's community. The value of respect is taught during childhood because the process of indigenous children participating in and learning about their community is an important aspect of the culture.

Respect as a form of behavior and participation is especially important in childhood as it serves as a basis of how children must conduct themselves in their community. Children engage in mature activities such as cooking for the family, cleaning and sweeping the house, caring for infant peers, and crop work. Indigenous children learn to view their participation in these activities as a representation of respect. Through this manner of participation in activities of respect, children not only learn about culture but also practice it as well.

See also 
 Dignity
 Etiquette
 :Category: Social graces
 Etiquette in Asia

References

Further reading 
Bloch, D. (1993). Positive self-talk for children, Teaching self-esteem through affirmations, A guide for parents, teachers, and counselors. New York: Bantam Books
Braman, O. R. (1997.) The oppositional child. Indiana: Kidsrights.
Brown, Asa D. (2012). Respect. Retrieved February 16, 2012.
Bueno, L. (2012). Teaching children about respect. Retrieved February 14, 2012.
Eriwn, E., Soodak, L. (2012). Respecting differences: Everyday ways to teach children about respect . Retrieved February

External links 

 Essay on Respect
 Respect Research Group: Multidisciplinary research project on interpersonal respect, with additional quotes, gallery, literature
 Respect Scoreboard
 On Respect and Religion
 What Does ‘Respect’ Mean?

Concepts in ethics
Cultural conventions
Human behavior
Interpersonal relationships
Virtue
Feeling